Blair Richardson (29 January 1941 – 6 March 1971) was a Canadian professional light middle/middle/light heavyweight boxer of the 1950s and 1960s who won the Maritime Middleweight Title, Canada middleweight title, and Commonwealth middleweight title, his professional fighting weight varied from , i.e. middleweight to , i.e. light heavyweight, he was managed by Jimmy Nemis, Johnny Buckley, Johnny Buckley Jr., and trained by Al Lacey, Charlie Pappas, and Johnny Sullo. Richardson was an alumnus of Emerson College, Boston, Massachusetts where he gained bachelor and master of science degrees in speech (minors in sociology and theology), after his retirement from boxing, he taught speech and the finer points of boxing at Northeastern University, Boston, Massachusetts for two years before joining the faculty at Emerson College in 1970, he was also a member of the Fellowship of Christian Athletes, and several speech organizations, he died at New England Deaconess Hospital in Boston, Massachusetts following surgery for a brain tumor. Richardson was inducted into the Nova Scotia Sport Hall of Fame in 1980.

Genealogical information
Richardson was the husband of Beverly (née MacDowell), who was expecting their first child, Lisa Richardson, at the time of his death.

References

External links

Image - Blair Richardson
Image - Blair Richardson

1941 births
1971 deaths
Emerson College alumni
Emerson College faculty
Light-heavyweight boxers
Light-middleweight boxers
Middleweight boxers
Canadian male boxers
Nova Scotia Sport Hall of Fame inductees
Place of birth missing
Deaths from brain cancer in the United States
Deaths from cancer in Massachusetts